John Walter MacDonald Bannerman (13 August 1932 – 8 October 2008) was a Scottish historian, noted for his work on Gaelic Scotland.

Biography 
He was born in Balmaha, Stirlingshire, the son of John MacDonald Bannerman, later Lord Bannerman of Kildonan, and his wife Ray Mundell. His family were native speakers of Scottish Gaelic, and Bannerman studied Celtic languages at the University of Glasgow and completed his doctorate at the University of Cambridge where he was taught by Kathleen Hughes.

Although he considered teaching Gaelic in schools, Bannerman instead took up a post at the Celtic department of the University of Aberdeen before joining the history department at the University of Edinburgh in 1967. He took over the running of the family farm at Balmaha in 1968, shortly before his father's death, dividing his time between teaching at the University, writing and farming.

His work on Gaelic Scotland was influential. His early works on Dál Riata, the Senchus fer n-Alban and the Iona chronicles which formed part of the later Chronicle of Ireland are contained in his 1974 book Studies in the History of Dalriada. He was a major contributor to the record of Late Medieval Monumental Sculpture in the West Highland published in 1977 and his study of the Beaton family—The Beatons: Medical Kindred in the Classical Gaelic Tradition—appeared in 1986. In his latter years he worked on the history of the Lordship of the Isles. He retired from teaching in 1997 and took up farming full-time at Balmaha.

Bannerman married Chrissie Dick in 1959. They had five children.

References

 

1932 births
2008 deaths
Celtic studies scholars
20th-century Scottish historians
Alumni of the University of Glasgow
Alumni of the University of Cambridge
Academics of the University of Edinburgh
People from Stirling (council area)
Sons of life peers